Fiera di Primiero (La Fiera in local dialect) was a comune (municipality) in Trentino in the northern Italian region Trentino-Alto Adige/Südtirol, located about  east of Trento. It was merged with Siror, Tonadico and Transacqua on January 1, 2016, to form a new municipality, Primiero San Martino di Castrozza.

References

External links
Official website 

Cities and towns in Trentino-Alto Adige/Südtirol